Fisayo is a Nigerian given name. Notable people with the name include:

Fisayo Adarabioyo (born 1995), English footballer
Fisayo Ajisola, Nigerian television and film actress, model, and singer
Fisayo Dele-Bashiru (born 2001), English footballer
Fisayo Soyombo, Nigerian journalist 

African given names